Giuseppe Dessì (7 August 1909 – 6 July 1977) was an Italian novelist, short-story writer and playwright from Sardinia. His novel Paese d'ombre won the 1972 Strega Prize and was translated into English as The Forests of Norbio.

Dessì grew up in Villacidro in Sardinia but later moved to Rome.

Works
 Il disertore, Milano: Feltrinelli, 1961. Translated by Virginia Hathaway Moriconi as The deserter, 1962.
 Paese d'ombre: Romanzo, Milan: A. Mondadori, 1972. Translated by Frances Frenaye as The forests of Norbio, New York : Harcourt Brace Jovanovich, 1975.

References

Further reading
 John C. Barnes, 'Giuseppe Dessì (1909-1977): A bibliography', Bulletin of the Society for Italian Studies, 15 (1982), pp. 26–36.

1909 births
1977 deaths
Italian male short story writers
Italian dramatists and playwrights
20th-century Italian novelists
20th-century Italian male writers
20th-century Italian dramatists and playwrights
Italian male novelists
Italian male dramatists and playwrights
20th-century Italian short story writers
Italian diarists
20th-century diarists